Natela Turnava (born 19 October 1968) is a Georgian politician. She was minister of Economy and Sustainable Development of Georgia from 18 April 2019 to 9 February 2022

Early life
Turnava was born in 1968 in Moscow in the capital of Russian SSR. She studied in No.56 Public School of Tbilisi and in 1990 she graduated from Tbilisi State University as an economist. In 1994–1996 she was a scientist at the Institute of Democracy and Politic of Georgia. From 2000 to 2005 she was the first assistant of Minister of Economy and Sustainable Development of Georgia. In 2005–2013 she was the first assistant of Minister of Economy and Sustainable Development of Georgia. In 2018–2019 she was the first assistant of Minister of Economy and Sustainable Development of Georgia. She knows English, Georgian and Russian languages. She was assistant of Minister of Economy and Sustainable Development of Georgia on 3 occasions.

References

Official web-page of Government of Georgia
Georgian Biographical Dictionary

1968 births
Living people
Government ministers of Georgia (country)
Women government ministers of Georgia (country)
21st-century women politicians from Georgia (country)
21st-century politicians from Georgia (country)
Tbilisi State University alumni